The Challenger Rio de Janeiro is a professional tennis tournament played on clay courts. It is part of the Association of Tennis Professionals (ATP) Challenger Tour. It is held in Rio de Janeiro, Brazil.

Past finals

Singles

Doubles

References

ATP Challenger Tour
Clay court tennis tournaments
Tennis tournaments in Brazil